Hamid Motahari (Persian: حمید مطهری born 25 April 1974 in Tehran, Iran) is an Iranian retired professional football midfielder and current coach who is head coach of Nassaji Mazandaran.

Early life 
Hamid Motahari born 25 April 1974 in Tehran Iran.

Hamid Motahari is married and result of this life is a daughter named Harir.

Hamid Motahari is a former player and Iranian football coach.

Club career 
He started his football career with the youth of Vahdat team and at the same time he played for the youth and adults.

He joined Persepolis after playing for teams such as Sepahan and Keshavarz.

He was a player at Persepolis until the end of his playing career, but with a serious injury, his playing career ended very quickly.

International career 
He was playing in the Iran U-20 1991–1993 and the Iran U-23 1993–1995

Managerial career

Saba Qom 
In 2007, he became the assistant coach of the Saba Qom.

Rah Ahan 
Hamid Motahari joined the Rah Ahan in 2009 at the age of 35 as a coach and was present in the technical staff of this club for about 2 years as an assistant coach.

Persepolis U-23 
In 2014, he became the head coach of Persepolis U–23.

Saipa 
After a year, he joined Saipa.

Paykan 
In 2016, he signed a contract with Paykan and was the assistant coach of Majid Jalali in this team for two years.

Nassaji 
After a short experience, he joined Nassaji Mazandaran.

Shahr Khodro 
In 2019 he was a member of the technical staff of Shahr Khodro.

Persepolis 
When Yahya Golmohammadi was in the Persepolis team, he also took Motahari to this team.

Hamid Motahhari has been Yahya Golmohammadi's assistant in Persepolis since 2020.

Nassaji Mazandaran 
Motahari was appointed as new head coach of Nassaji football team.

Career Statistics 

 Club
 Vahdat 1990-1992
 Sepahan Azadegan League 1993-1996
 Fath Tehran Azadegan League 1995-1997
 Keshavarz Azadegan League 1996-1997
 Persepolis Azadegan League 1997-1999
 International

Honours

Coaching 

 Persepolis (as Assistant Coach)

 Persian Gulf Pro League (2): 2019–20 , 2020–21 ; Runner-Up: 2021–22
 Iranian Super Cup (1): 2020 ; Runner-Up: 2021
 AFC Champions League Runner-Up: 2020

 Nassaji Mazandaran (as Head Coach)
Iranian Super Cup Runner-up :  2022

References

External links 
Hamid Motahari on Instagram
Hamid Motahari at Soccerway
Hamid Motahari at  PersianLeague.com
Hamid Motahari at  Sortitoutsi

1974 births
Living people
Sportspeople from Tehran
Iranian footballers
F.C. Nassaji Mazandaran managers
Persepolis F.C. non-playing staff
Persepolis F.C. players
Iranian football managers
Keshavarz players
Sepahan S.C. footballers